Ratón de ferretería is a Venezuelan film released in 1985. It was written and directed by Román Chalbaud based on his homonymous theater play.

External links 
 

1985 films
Venezuelan drama films
Films directed by Román Chalbaud
1980s Spanish-language films
Venezuelan films based on plays